Annette M. Cleveland (née Forbes, born 1962) is an American politician of the Democratic Party. She is a member of the Washington State Senate from the 49th legislative district. She was first elected to that office in November 2012 for a term beginning in January 2013. She was elected with nearly 60% of the vote, against Republican Eileen Qutub.

References

1962 births
Living people
Democratic Party Washington (state) state senators
Women state legislators in Washington (state)
Marylhurst University alumni
Politicians from Vancouver, Washington
21st-century American politicians
21st-century American women politicians